Lubabalo 'Giant' Mtyanda (born 19 March 1986) is a South African rugby union player for the Colorno in Italian Top10. His regular position is lock.

Career

He joined the  later in the same year, where he represented their Under–21 team. He made four appearances for them in the 2007 Vodacom Cup and also represented  in the 2008 Varsity Cup, but failed to break into the first team.

In 2013, he joined the  prior to the 2013 Currie Cup First Division season. He was also included in a South Africa President's XV team that played in the 2013 IRB Tbilisi Cup and won the tournament after winning all three matches.

He was played for the Southern Kings in the 2017 Super Rugby season and until 2019. From 2019 to 20221 he played also in italy with Rovigo Delta and Rugby Colorno.

References

1986 births
Living people
Rugby union players from Port Elizabeth
Xhosa people
South African rugby union players
Golden Lions players
SWD Eagles players
Southern Kings players
Pumas (Currie Cup) players
Sharks (rugby union) players
Eastern Province Elephants players
Rugby Rovigo Delta players
Rugby union locks
Rugby Colorno players